Gary Ponting (born 17 January 1975) is an English former professional snooker player.

Career

Ponting was born in 1975, and turned professional in 1993. He reached the last 32 of the 1994 World Championship, losing 2–10 to Willie Thorne, and the same stage of the 1996 Thailand Open, where Peter Ebdon defeated him 5–0.

Further progress to the last 16 of another four ranking events followed, notably at the 1998 UK Championship, where he made five century breaks including the highest of his career, a 138.

Ponting reached a career-high ranking of 49th for the 1999/2000 season, retaining his top-64 place until the start of the 2002/2003 season. However, having suffered a loss of form, Ponting entered only one tournament after this, the 2003 World Championship, where he lost 1–10 in qualifying to India's Manan Chandra.

Ponting's ranking had slipped to 73rd by 2003, and he lost his professional status at the age of 28.

Performance and rankings timeline

References

English snooker players
1975 births
Living people